Price Activity (PAC) charts are a type of stock chart used in the Technical Analysis of stocks.

PAC charts are unique in the way they represent "volume" (the number of shares traded every day). Traditional stock charts display volume data as a histogram on the bottom of stock charts. PAC charts, on the other hand, track and compound estimated volume data at each price level and color-code this information directly in the stock chart.

This approach adds an order of magnitude of information to the chart, as volume is charted in 2-D instead of 1-D.  The "infrared" palette of coloring provides readers with an intuitive way of detecting significant volume changes.

Financial charts